Charles F. Eppers (16 September 1919 – 17 January 1999) was an American politician.

Henry Eppers and Minnie Knemeyer were both of German descent. Eppers immigrated to the United States from Germany at the age of eight, while Knemeyer was a native of Illinois. They married and raised four children, one of whom was Frederick Eppers. Frederick Eppers married Bertha, and their son Charles was born on 16 September 1919 in Keokuk, Iowa. Charles was educated in Keokuk and served in the United States Army Air Forces during World War II. Upon returning to Keokuk after the war, Eppers invested in local cafes and the eponymous Eppers Hotel.

Like his grandfather Henry, Charles Eppers was affiliated with the Democratic Party. He took office as a member of the Iowa Senate for District 1 in January 1959, and served a full four-year term through 1963. Within the senate, Eppers was a member of a steering committee formed in 1961 to increase the speed at which bills were considered, and proposed one of eleven bills on reapportionment during the session. From 1972 to 1978, Charles Eppers served as mayor of Keokuk. During his mayoralty, the Keokuk–Hamilton Bridge was planned. In 1980, he was elected to the Lee County board of supervisors. Upon his resignation, Eppers was succeeded by Jerry Kearns on 1 January 1983, who ran for a full term in his own right the next year. Charles Eppers died on 17 January 1999, aged 75.

References

Military personnel from Iowa
County supervisors in Iowa
Businesspeople from Iowa
20th-century American businesspeople
American restaurateurs
American hoteliers
1919 births
People from Keokuk, Iowa
Mayors of places in Iowa
Democratic Party Iowa state senators
1999 deaths
20th-century American politicians
American people of German descent
United States Army Air Forces pilots of World War II